KVIK (104.7 FM) is a radio station licensed to serve Decorah, the county seat of Winneshiek County, Iowa.  The station is owned by Wennes Communications Stations, Inc.

KVIK broadcasts a classic hits music format to northeast Iowa. On weekends, the station broadcasts live NASCAR Nationwide Series and Sprint Cup Series motor racing via Performance Racing Network and Motor Racing Network. It also airs local high school sports, primarily Decorah High School sports in their respective seasons, including basketball and football.

The station was assigned the "KVIK" call sign by the Federal Communications Commission on April 25, 1994.

References

External links
KVIK official website

VIK
Classic hits radio stations in the United States
Radio stations established in 1994
Winneshiek County, Iowa
1994 establishments in Iowa